The State Prize of Ukraine in the Field of Architecture is a state award of Ukraine  established to honor the creation of outstanding residential, civil and industrial architectural complexes, buildings and structures, work in the field of urban planning, landscape architecture, restoration of architectural monuments and architecture, and scientific works on the theory and history of architecture, which are important for the further development of national architecture and urban planning and have gained wide public recognition.

Laureates 
Volodymyr Babayev
Heorhiy Kirpa
Anatoliy Kukoba
Vladimir Konstantinov
Oleksandr Lukyanchenko
Oleksandr Omelchenko
Viktor Ostapchuk
Vasyl Semeniuk
Volodymyr Shcherban
Valery Shmukler
Volodymyr Stelmakh
Ihor Surkis
Victor Vechersky

See also 

List of Ukrainian State Prizes

References 

State Prizes of Ukraine
Architecture in Ukraine
1988 in Ukraine
Ukrainian architecture awards